James Castling Farrar (born 19 June 1987) is an English actor and former model, known for his roles as Liam Gilmore in the Channel 4 soap opera Hollyoaks and Zack Hudson in the BBC soap opera EastEnders.

Early and personal life
Farrar was born on 19 June 1987 in Greenwich, London. He undertook a drama and media studies degree at the University of Portsmouth graduating in 2008. He graduated from the Royal Central School of Speech and Drama in 2010. He is also a qualified personal trainer and vegan chef.  He married Ali Roff Farrar in 2017 and they have a daughter born in 2021.

Career
Prior to acting, Farrar worked as a model. Farrar made his acting debut in an episode of EastEnders as Brendan, before appearing in a number of short films including Donkey, Dominic and Loser. In 2011, he joined the cast of the Channel 4 soap opera Hollyoaks as Liam Gilmore. He left the role in 2013.

In 2021, he joined the BBC One soap opera EastEnders as Zack Hudson, the long lost half-brother of Sharon Watts (Letitia Dean) and son of Gavin Sullivan (Paul Nicholas).

Filmography

Awards and nominations

References

External links
 

21st-century English male actors
Alumni of the Royal Central School of Speech and Drama
English male soap opera actors
Living people
Place of birth missing (living people)
1987 births